Abu al-Hussein al-Husseini al-Qurashi is the fourth and current caliph of the Islamic State, starting from 30 November 2022. His position was announced by the IS spokesman Abu Omar Al-Muhajir in an audio recording stating that his predecessor Abu al-Hasan al-Hashimi al-Qurashi was killed in battle. Abu al-Hussein was described as a veteran of Islamic State and a loyal member of the group. In January 2023, a prominent dissident anti-IS leadership channel alleged that Abu al-Hussein is Iraqi like his predecessors and is appointed by shura council led by Abdul Raouf al-Muhajir emir of Islamic State's administration.

Rise to power 
Abu al-Hussein al-Husseini took over leadership of the Islamic State after the death of the previous leader Abu al-Hasan. He was announced as caliph by Islamic State's official spokesmen Abu Umar al-Muhajir in an audio messaged broadcast by Al-Furqan Media foundation (Islamic State's primary media).

Leader of the Islamic State 

As of January 2023, Abu al-Hussein has received pledges from all Islamic State provinces, and also from Islamic State supporters in around 40 countries & he has also received some pledges of support from outside people who were not previously part of the group.

Notes

References

Living people
21st-century caliphs
Salafi jihadists
Islamic State of Iraq and the Levant members
Date of birth missing (living people)
Place of birth missing (living people)
Year of birth missing (living people)